Zakir Hossain Raju is a Bangladeshi film director. Besides film-making, he is also a story writer, screenplay and dialogue writer. He won three National Film Awards for the films Bhalobaslei Ghor Bandha Jay Na (2010) and Moner Moto Manush Pailam Na (2019).

Early life
Zakir was educated in journalism at the University of Dhaka.

Filmography

Awards

See also 
 Bangladesh National Film Award for Best Story
 Bangladesh National Film Award for Best Dialogue

References

External links 
 

Living people
Bangladeshi film directors
Best Dialogue National Film Award (Bangladesh) winners
Best Story National Film Award (Bangladesh) winners
Place of birth missing (living people)
Date of birth missing (living people)
Year of birth missing (living people)